Rich Edson (born August 2, 1981, in Ridgewood, New Jersey) is the State Department Correspondent for Fox News Channel and a former Washington Correspondent for Fox Business Network.

He holds a Master of Science in journalism from Columbia University Graduate School of Journalism in New York, New York and a dual degree in history and journalism from Rutgers College of Rutgers University in New Brunswick, New Jersey. During his college years, Edson announced Rutgers sports on WRSU-FM and interned for Saturday Night Live. Edson grew up in Dumont, New Jersey and attended Dumont High School, where he met his future wife as a member of the marchingband.

References

External links
 Rich Edson – Fox News

Living people
1981 births
21st-century American journalists
American television reporters and correspondents
Dumont High School alumni
Fox News people
People from Dumont, New Jersey
People from Ridgewood, New Jersey
Columbia University Graduate School of Journalism alumni